Rabetino is a village in the municipality of Kičevo, North Macedonia. It used to be part of the former Vraneštica Municipality.

Name
The name of the toponym derives via metathesis from Arb to Rab and with the suffix -ino, from a prefix Arbet-ino. Examples of this change, include Slavic Raban for the Arbani (Albanians) and for the Land of the Arbans (Albanians)- Rabania instead of the Albanian form Arbënia.

Demographics
As of the 2021 census, Rabetino had 5 residents with the following ethnic composition:
Macedonians 4
Persons for whom data are taken from administrative sources 1

According to the 2002 census, the village had a total of 195 inhabitants. Ethnic groups in the village include:
Macedonians 3

References

External links

Villages in Kičevo Municipality